Caroline Billingham-Jones (born 12 July 1967) is a British former professional tennis player.

Biography
Billingham is a daughter of Labour politician Angela Billingham, Baroness of Banbury.

Educated at Banbury School, Billingham joined the international tennis circuit in the late 1980s. She competed regularly in Wimbledon qualifying during her career and made a main draw appearance in the women's doubles at the 1987 Wimbledon Championships. Her four ITF doubles titles included one $25,000 tournament, in Nigeria in 1991. As a singles player she reached a best ranking of 359 in the world and was the joint winner of the 1992 Scottish Championships.

She is a former captain of the Oxfordshire women's county side, holding the position for 12 years.

ITF finals

Doubles (4–5)

References

External links
 
 

1967 births
Living people
British female tennis players
English female tennis players
Tennis people from Oxfordshire